One Sunny Day is a 2014 South Korean web series that aired on Line TV from December 19, 2014 to January 10, 2015 for 10 episodes. It was only available on Line TV to Thailand audiences and was not aired in South Korea, but was later released on DramaFever.

Plot
Kim Ji-ho (So Ji-sub) is a broken hearted man who winds up in Jeju Island for a work project but he keeps running into a girl (Kim Ji-won). Both of them get robbed and have to sleep in the same guest house. They depend on each other for a day as his wallet and her phone got stolen. As they stay in Jeju Island, she heals his broken heart and they fall in love.

Cast
So Ji-sub as Kim Ji-ho 
Kim Ji-won as The Girl (Kim Ji-ho)
Lee Jong-hyuk as Young-ho
Lim Ju-eun as Ji-ho's ex-girlfriend
Lee Jong-hyun as Couple Guy
Mimi as Couple Girl
Baek Seung-hee as Couple Girl
Ha Jae-sook
Kim Mi-kyung

References

External links

South Korean web series
South Korean romance television series
Television series by Hwa&Dam Pictures
2014 web series debuts
2015 web series endings